Cedar Hedge Lake is a lake in Green Lake Township, Grand Traverse County. The lake is part of the Betsie River system.

See also 
 List of lakes of Michigan

References 

Lakes of Grand Traverse County, Michigan